The Chronicle of the Horse is an American weekly equestrian magazine. It covers dressage, hunters and jumpers, eventing, foxhunting and steeplechase racing.

It was started in 1937 by Stacy Barcroft Lloyd Jr and Gerald Webb. It is headquartered in Middleburg, Virginia, in a building adjacent to the National Sporting Library. In 1953, it changed from tabloid to magazine size. Its website was created in 1998 and forums in 1999. In 2013, the Ohrstrom family sold the Chronicle to Mark Bellissimo, owner of the Winter Equestrian Festival.

References

External links
 Official website

1937 establishments in the United States
Sports magazines published in the United States
Weekly magazines published in the United States
Equine magazines
Horses in the United States
Magazines established in 1937
Magazines published in Virginia